The Meio-norte (mid-north) is one of the four subregions of northeast Brazil. It is a climatic transition area located between the equatorial Amazon and semi-arid hinterlands.

Due to the region's great variation in the amount of rainfall, agriculture is characterized by a very poor, limited to the cultivation of rice, in Maranhão and the raising of cattle, in Piauí, in areas of cerrado. Due to its climate, vegetation has a typical, composed of babassu and coconut palms of the carnauba (Forest of Cocais).

References

Climate of Brazil
Forestry in Brazil
Agriculture in Brazil
Northeast Region, Brazil